Jacqueline Clark (born 14 March 1963) is a New Zealand former  cricketer who played as a left-handed opening batter. She appeared in 11 Test matches and 31 One Day Internationals for New Zealand between 1984 and 1992, including playing for New Zealand at the 1988 Women's Cricket World Cup. She played domestic cricket for Central Districts and Wellington.

On her Test debut, against England in 1984, Clark was New Zealand's top scorer, with 79 in the second innings. When Australia played a three-match series of one-day matches in New Zealand in January 1986, Clark top-scored for New Zealand in every match, with 81, 59 and 36 not out. She was one of the leading scorers at the 1988 Women's World Cup, with 266 runs at an average of 44.33, including 85 against The Netherlands and 76 against Ireland.

References

External links

1963 births
Living people
Cricketers from New Plymouth
New Zealand women cricketers
New Zealand women Test cricketers
New Zealand women One Day International cricketers
Central Districts Hinds cricketers
Wellington Blaze cricketers